The Supreme Court of Judicature Act (Ireland) 1877 was an Act of the Parliament of the United Kingdom that brought about a major reorganisation of the superior courts in Ireland. It created a Supreme Court of Judicature, comprising the High Court of Justice in Ireland and the Court of Appeal in Ireland. It mirrored in Ireland the changes which the Supreme Court of Judicature Act 1873 had made in the courts of England and Wales.

Provisions
The Act marked the fusion of the administration of common law and equity in Ireland, although not a merger of the jurisdictions themselves. Prior to the Act coming into force a litigant had to sue in equity in the Court of Chancery and at common law in the common law courts of the Common Pleas, the Exchequer, and the Queen's Bench. Mirroring earlier legislation applying to England and Wales, the Act merged these four courts to become a single High Court of Justice in Ireland; the old courts continued as divisions of the new court. Amending legislation later abolished all but the King's Bench Division and Chancery Division of the High Court.

The Act also created a new Court of Appeal in Ireland.

Partition and subsequent developments
The "Supreme Court of Judicature in Ireland" that was created by the 1877 Act was abolished by the Government of Ireland Act 1920, s. 38; in its place were established a separate Supreme Court of Judicature for each of Northern Ireland and Southern Ireland, together with an overarching "High Court of Appeal for Ireland" with appellate jurisdiction for the whole of Ireland.  The two new Supreme Courts of Judicature were constituted on a similar basis to the court they replaced, with both being made up of a High Court of Justice and a Court of Appeal (ss. 39, 40).

Irish Free State and the Republic of Ireland
The Irish Free State was established on 6 December 1922, comprising the territory which had been designated as Southern Ireland. Article 75 of the Constitution of the Irish Free State carried over the existing court structure for Southern Ireland; this included the courts established under the 1920 Act, with the exception of the High Court of Appeal for Ireland, which was abolished by the Irish Free State (Consequential Provisions) Act 1922, an act of the United Kingdom Parliament. Subsequently, the Courts of Justice Act 1924 transferred the jurisdiction of the High Court of Justice to the court of the same name created by that Act, and the jurisdiction of the Court of Appeal to the Supreme Court of Justice. Both these jurisdictions have been continued by subsequent legislation.

The Supreme Court of Judicature Act (Ireland) 1877 has not been repealed in the Republic of Ireland and thus remains part of its law; the Act was expressly preserved by the Statute Law Revision Act 2007.

Northern Ireland
In Northern Ireland the Act was repealed by the Judicature (Northern Ireland) Act 1978.  However, that Act established a new Supreme Court of Judicature that is of largely the same shape as that established under the 1920 Act, although it also includes a Crown Court in Northern Ireland (which tries indictable offences). Since the establishment of the Supreme Court of the United Kingdom, Northern Ireland's Supreme Court has been known as the Court of Judicature in Northern Ireland.

References

Sources

Citations

Further reading
William Dwyer Ferguson and George Napier Ferguson. A Treatise on the Supreme Court of Judicature Act (Ireland) 1877. Hodges, Foster and Figgis. Dublin. 1878. Google Books. Internet Archive.
James Moody Lowry. The Supreme Court of Judicature (Ireland) Act, 1877. W King. Upper Ormond Quay, Dublin. 1878. Reviewed at "Reviews" (1878) 12 Irish Law Times and Solicitors' Journal 62 (2 February 1878).
John Harvey Hogan. A Summary of the Supreme Court of Judicature Act (Ireland) 1877. Hendrick & Co. Clare Street, Dublin. 1878. Reviewed at "Reviews" (1878) 12 Irish Law Times and Solicitors' Journal 125 (9 March 1878).
William Dillon. The Supreme Court of Judicature (Ireland) Act, 1877. E Ponsonby. Dublin. 1879. Google Books.
The Supreme Court of Judicature (Ireland) Act, 1877 (40° & 41° Vic., Cap 57). John Falconer. Upper Sackville Street, Dublin. 1879. Google Books.
Luke Sweetman Eiffe assisted by A Houston and J O Wylie. The Judicature Acts (Ireland), 1877 and 1878 and Orders, Rules and Forms thereunder, copiously annotated. E Ponsonby. Grafton Street, Dublin. Stevens and Sons. Chancery Lane, London. 1881. Google Books. Catalogue.

United Kingdom Acts of Parliament 1877
Acts of the Parliament of the United Kingdom concerning Ireland
1877 in Ireland